Lodewicus Theodorus "Louis" Oosthuizen (born  1982) is a South African professional golfer who won the 2010 Open Championship. He has finished runner-up in all four major championships: the 2012 Masters Tournament, the 2015 and 2021 U.S. Open, the 2015 Open Championship, and the PGA Championship in 2017 and 2021. His highest placing on the Official World Golf Ranking is fourth, which he reached in January 2013.

Early life and amateur career
Oosthuizen was born in Mossel Bay, South Africa. His early career was supported financially for three years by the foundation of fellow South African golfer Ernie Els. He won numerous amateur titles before turning professional in 2002 at the age of 19.

Professional career 
He won five professional tournaments on the Sunshine Tour before he won on the EuropeanTour: the 2004 Vodacom Origins of Golf Tour event at Arabella, the 2007 Dimension Data Pro-Am and Platinum Classic, and the Telkom PGA Championship twice, in 2007 and 2008.

He played on the European Challenge Tour in 2003 and has been a member of the European Tour since 2004. In 2009, he finished 31st on the Race to Dubai. On 10 September 2012 he reached the top 10 of the Official World Golf Ranking for the first time in his career.

In March 2010, he won his first European Tour event at the Open de Andalucia de Golf. The month after he won the 2010 Masters Par 3 Contest.

2010 Open Championship
Oosthuizen entered the 2010 Open Championship at St Andrews ranked 54th in the Official World Golf Ranking, and only having made one cut in eight major championship appearances. He shot a 65 on the first day, placing him in second place, behind a 63 shot by Rory McIlroy.

Oosthuizen's 67 on Friday was the low round of the day and gave him a lead that he would not relinquish throughout the final two rounds. His two-day total of 132 tied the record for the lowest 36-hole score in an Open Championship at St Andrews. A 69 on Saturday placed Oosthuizen at 15-under-par, and four shots clear of second-place Paul Casey with one round to play.

On Sunday, Casey closed the gap to three shots on the 8th hole, before Oosthuizen drove the 9th green and made a long putt for eagle. On the 12th hole, Oosthuizen made birdie, while Casey hit his drive into a gorse bush, and wound up making triple bogey to give Oosthuizen an eight-shot lead. In the end, Oosthuizen shot 71 on Sunday, and 16-under-par 272 for the championship, to win by seven strokes. His 272 was the second lowest in St Andrews history. Casey eventually finished third with Lee Westwood taking second.

Oosthuizen became the fourth man from South Africa to win the Claret Jug – following Bobby Locke, Gary Player, and Ernie Els – and moved to 15th in the Official World Golf Ranking, leapfrogging fellow South African Retief Goosen in 16th position.

Oosthuizen said that his exemplary focus during the tournament, which enabled him to win by a wide margin, was due to a red spot marked on his glove. He would look at that spot as the beginning of his pre-shot routine and use it to help him remain focused before and during his swing. Oosthuizen had consulted Karl Morris, a Manchester-based sports psychologist, prior to the event for ways in which he could improve his concentration.

After 2010

Oosthuizen finished the 2010 season in 10th place on the Race to Dubai, posting three further top-10s after his major win. In January 2011, he claimed his third European Tour title, and his sixth in his home country, winning the Africa Open in a playoff. In 2012, Oosthuizen successfully defended his title at the Africa Open with a two stroke victory over Tjaart van der Walt. His success was helped by a second round 62, which took Oosthuizen to the top of the leaderboard at the halfway stage and from there he held on for victory.

Oosthuizen was runner-up at the 2012 Masters Tournament. In the final round, he scored an albatross on the second hole of Augusta National Golf Club. This was only the fourth ever albatross in Masters history, and the first to be televised, as well as the first ever on that hole. Oosthuizen took the outright lead of the tournament with this exceptional shot, and maintained the lead until caught on the 16th hole, by Bubba Watson. He was eventually defeated by Watson on the second hole of a sudden-death playoff. He won his fifth European Tour title at the Maybank Malaysian Open the following week. In the second event of the 2012 PGA Tour FedEx Cup Playoffs, the Deutsche Bank Championship, Oosthuizen held the 54-hole lead by three strokes and came close to his first victory on US soil, finishing second to Rory McIlroy by one shot. On 10 September 2012, he reached the top 10 of the Official World Golf Ranking for the first time in his career. He finished the season ranked third on the Race to Dubai.

On 13 January 2013, he won the Volvo Golf Champions, shooting a six-under-par 66 final round to win the title by one stroke.

In January 2014, he retained the Volvo Golf Champions title by one shot over Branden Grace.

Oosthuizen finished as a joint runner-up in the 2015 Open Championship at St Andrews after losing in a four-hole aggregate playoff during a Monday finish to the event. He was in the final group tied for the 54-hole co-lead but needed to birdie the 18th hole during his final round to tie the lead at 15-under and join Zach Johnson and Marc Leishman in the playoff. In the four-hole playoff, he birdied the first hole alongside Johnson, but could not convert his birdie putt on the second hole, giving Johnson a one-stroke advantage. All three players bogeyed the third hole and after Johnson missed his birdie putt on the final hole, Oosthuizen had a 15 footer to extend the playoff to sudden death. However his putt caught the lip on the low side and he finished at even-par, one stroke behind Johnson. This was Oosthuizen's second consecutive runner-up placing in a major championship, following the 2015 U.S. Open.

On 13 August 2017, Oosthuizen finished joint runner-up at the PGA Championship, finishing a career "second-place" Grand Slam.

On 9 December 2018, Oosthuizen won the South African Open. This event was co-sanctioned by the European Tour, Sunshine Tour and the Asian Tour.

In December 2019, Oosthuizen played on the International team at the 2019 Presidents Cup at Royal Melbourne Golf Club in Australia. The U.S. team won 16–14. Oosthuizen went 2–1–1 and lost a 3 up lead to halve his Sunday singles match against Matt Kuchar.

In May 2021, Oosthuizen finished in a tie for second place at the 2021 PGA Championship for his fifth runner-up finish in a major championship. In June, Oosthuizen finished in second place at the 2021 U.S. Open at Torrey Pines Golf Course in La Jolla, California for a sixth major runner-up finish. In July, Oosthuizen finished in a tie for third place at the 2021 Open Championship at Royal St George's Golf Club in Sandwich, Kent, alongside Jon Rahm and behind Jordan Spieth and winner Collin Morikawa.

In June 2022, Oosthuizen joined LIV Golf and resigned from the PGA Tour; following the commencement of the first event on 9 June 2022, the PGA Tour suspended all members who were participating in the new series, including those who had resigned, as they had not been granted a release by the tour.

Amateur wins
2000 World Junior Championship
2001 All African Games (Kenya), Transvaal Amateur Stroke Play Championship (South Africa)
2002 Indian Amateur Open Championship (tied), Irish Amateur Open Championship, Natal Open Stroke Play Championship (South Africa)

Professional wins (14)

PGA Tour wins (1)

PGA Tour playoff record (0–3)

European Tour wins (9)

1Co-sanctioned by the Sunshine Tour
2Co-sanctioned by the Asian Tour
3Co-sanctioned by the PGA Tour of Australasia

European Tour playoff record (1–3)

Asian Tour wins (3)

1Co-sanctioned by the European Tour
2Co-sanctioned by the PGA Tour of Australasia
3Co-sanctioned by the Sunshine Tour

Asian Tour playoff record (0–1)

Sunshine Tour wins (8)

1Co-sanctioned by the European Tour
2Co-sanctioned by the Asian Tour

Sunshine Tour playoff record (2–1)

Playoff record
LIV Golf League playoff record (0–1)

Major championships

Wins (1)

Results timeline
Results not in chronological order in 2020.

CUT = missed the half-way cut
WD = withdrew
"T" = tied
NT = No tournament due to COVID-19 pandemic

Summary

Most consecutive cuts made – 15 (2017 PGA – 2021 Open Championship)
Longest streak of top-10s – 3 (2021 PGA – 2021 Open Championship)

Results in The Players Championship

CUT = missed the halfway cut
"T" indicates a tie for a place
C = Cancelled after the first round due to the COVID-19 pandemic

Results in World Golf Championships
Results not in chronological order before 2015.
 
1Cancelled due to COVID-19 pandemic

QF, R16, R32, R64 = Round in which player lost in match play
NT = no tournament
"T" = tied
Note that the HSBC Champions did not become a WGC event until 2009.
Note that the Championship and Invitational were discontinued from 2022.

Team appearances
Amateur
Eisenhower Trophy (representing South Africa): 2002

Professional
World Cup (representing South Africa): 2011
Presidents Cup (representing the International team): 2013, 2015, 2017, 2019

See also
2005 European Tour Qualifying School graduates
List of golfers with most European Tour wins

References

External links

South African male golfers
Sunshine Tour golfers
European Tour golfers
PGA Tour golfers
LIV Golf players
Winners of men's major golf championships
Afrikaner people
South African people of Dutch descent
Sportspeople from the Western Cape
People from Mossel Bay
1982 births
Living people